Walbo is an unincorporated community in Springvale Township, Isanti County, Minnesota, United States.

The community is located at the junction of State Highway 95 (MN 95) and Isanti County Road 1.  Walbo is located west of Cambridge.

The Rum River flows through the community.  Nearby places also include Bradford, Pine Brook, and Springvale County Park.

References

 Official State of Minnesota Highway Map – 2013/2014 edition

Unincorporated communities in Minnesota
Unincorporated communities in Isanti County, Minnesota